Group A of the men's football tournament at the 2012 Summer Olympics took place from 26 July to 1 August 2012 in Cardiff's Millennium Stadium, Coventry's City of Coventry Stadium, London's Wembley Stadium and Manchester's Old Trafford. The group contained host nation Great Britain, Senegal, United Arab Emirates and Uruguay.

Teams

Standings

In the quarter-finals,
The winner of Group A, Great Britain, advanced to play the runner-up of Group B, South Korea.
The runner-up of Group A, Senegal, advanced to play the winner of Group B, Mexico.

Matches

United Arab Emirates vs Uruguay

Great Britain vs Senegal

Senegal vs Uruguay

Great Britain vs United Arab Emirates

Senegal vs United Arab Emirates

Great Britain vs Uruguay

References

Group A
2012–13 in Emirati football
Group
2012 in Senegalese sport
Group
Football in Senegal